The British Sub-Aqua Club or BSAC has been recognised since 1954 by UK Sport as the national governing body of recreational diving in the United Kingdom.

The club was founded in 1953 and at its peak in the mid-1990s had over 50,000 members declining to over 30,000 in 2009. It is a diver training organization that operates through its associated network of around 1,100 local, independent diving clubs and around 400 diving schools worldwide. The old logo featured the Roman god Neptune (Greek god Poseidon), god of the sea. The new logo, as of 2017, features a diver with the updated BSAC motto "Dive with us".

BSAC is unusual for a diver training agency in that most BSAC instructors are volunteers, giving up their spare time to train others, unlike many other agencies, in which instructors are paid employees, or self-employed.

Given that UK waters are relatively cold and have restricted visibility, BSAC training is regarded by its members as more comprehensive than some. Specifically it places emphasis on rescue training very early in the programme. BSAC also maintains links with other organisations, such as NACSAC.

Science writer and science fiction author Arthur C. Clarke was a famous member of BSAC.

The current President of BSAC is the Prince of Wales.  His grandfather Philip, father Charles, and brother Harry all trained with BSAC.

History
For earlier events, see Oscar Gugen.
 15 October 1953: BSAC founded by Oscar Gugen, Peter Small, Mary Small, and Trevor Hampton.  Jack Atkinson, an aero engineer, was appointed as the club's first national diving officer. He wrote training bulletins which built up to form the club's training doctrine and was used later as the basis for the BSAC Diving Manual
 1954: First BSAC branch formed, in London.
 1954: Members of the newly formed BSAC Branch No.9, Southsea Sub-Aqua Club, invent the new sport of "Octopush", a game now played internationally and more commonly known outside of the United Kingdom as Underwater Hockey.
 March 1955: BSAC is accepted by the Central Council of Physical Recreation.
 1957: Alan Broadhurst became BSAC's second national diving officer. He modernized BSAC official diving terminology, including getting rid of the word "frogman".
 October 1957: BSAC's first overseas branch is formed in Kingston, Jamaica.
 January 1959: First edition of the BSAC Diving Manual appeared and cost ten shillings (now 50p). It was written by George Brookes and Alan Broadhurst.
 January 1957: BSAC and 14 other national diving federations agreed to found Confédération Mondiale des Activités Subaquatiques (CMAS) 
 November 1960: First Diving Officers' Conference, at St. Abbs, with fifteen delegates.
 1965: Fort Bovisand diving center opened.
 1973: The Diving Incident Pit at Diving Officers Conference presented by E. John Towse.
 1988: Release of the BS-AC 88 dive table
 1995: BSAC allows Nitrox diving and introduced Nitrox training.
 20 May 1997: BSAC was expelled from the Confédération Mondiale des Activités Subaquatiques (CMAS)
 2001: BSAC allows rebreather use by BSAC branches.
 2006: BSAC mixed gas diving.
 2006: BSAC is the first recreational diving agency to introduce Nitrox diving as part of core training.

Recognition
BSAC is recognised by the successors of the Sports Council as the National Governing Body (NGB) for Sub Aqua within the United Kingdom.  It has held this status since 1954. 'Sub Aqua' (or Sub Aquatics) is a broad term that includes both recreational underwater activities such as recreational diving and snorkelling, and competitive underwater activities including underwater sports such as Octopush. It is also recognised by Sport England as the NGB for Sub Aqua in England.

BSAC is one of three NGBs representing 'Sub Aqua' in the constituent countries of the United Kingdom. The others are the Northern Ireland Federation of Sub-Aqua Clubs (Northern Ireland) and the Scottish Sub Aqua Club (Scotland) with the British Sub Aqua Club being the NGB for the United Kingdom as a whole; a role it has held since 1954. Wales has been represented by the British Sub Aqua Club since January 2016 when it replaced the Welsh Association of Sub Aqua Clubs.

Qualifications
BSAC has offered two separate training schemes since the 1950s: the Diver Training Programme (DTP) for scuba diving and the Snorkeller Training Programme (STP) for snorkelling.

Diver Training Programme

Diving
BSAC currently has five diver qualifications (known as grades). These are: 
 : Basic skills, non-decompression diving (depth limit 20 m)
 : Rescue, navigation, nitrox and decompression diving (depth limit increased to 35 m with a series of 5 m progression dives.)
 : Dive leading, dive planning and management, and rescue management (depth limit increased to 50 m by completing a selection of experience dives.)
 : Fully trained diver capable of leading a group of divers in normal club activities
 : Trained to lead a group of dives carrying out a project. This is nationally examined with a two-day practical test

Instructing
BSAC has eight instructor grades: 
 : Trained but unqualified. Must be supervised when instructing
 : Qualified to instruct unsupervised in the classroom
 : Qualified to teach open water under supervision
 : Qualified to instruct unsupervised in open water
 : Qualified to supervise other instructors in classroom and open water training
 : Trained to teach advanced skills, such as boat based skills and group diving techniques
 : Qualified to staff Instructor events
 : Leads Instructor Training courses and BSAC National exams

Grades no longer awarded
The following grades which are no longer awarded may still be encountered:
 : A diver who has completed the extensive sheltered-water (i.e. pool) training of the BSAC syllabus of the time, but has not yet dived in open water.
 : A Novice I diver who has completed two open-water assessment dives.
The distinction between Novice I and Novice II was mostly for practical reasons to do with the difference between hiring a pool and travelling to the coast. A Novice I diver would normally complete the two open-water dives as soon as possible, but if this were not possible straight away (perhaps over winter) they would at least have a specific grade within the club. The lengthy and club-oriented Novice syllabus was replaced with the Club Diver and Ocean Diver syllabuses in the late 1990s. (However, some argue the Novice description was usefully accurate and aided diver safety because nobody with such a qualification would attempt dives beyond their capabilities.)
 : This is more or less the same as Ocean Diver; originally the two were operated in parallel with Ocean Diver awarded at schools and Club Diver at clubs.
 : An instructor grade junior to Open Water Instructor, but allowing the holder to instruct practical and theory lessons without supervision.
 : This was the entry-level grade prior to the splitting of its syllabus during the mid-1980s to create the Novice and Sports Diver grades. Divers who held this grade at the time were awarded the Sports Diver grade.
 : This was the immediate grade prior to the splitting of its syllabus during the mid-1980s to create the Dive Leader and Advanced Diver grades. Divers who held this grade at the time were awarded the Advanced Diver grade.

CMAS equivalencies
The following CMAS equivalencies have been agreed with the Sub-Aqua Association.

Skill development/specialities
BSAC also has a range of specialist skill courses known as Skill Development Courses (SDCs):

Club Diving:
 Accelerated Decompression Procedures
 Buoyancy and Trim Workshop
 Compressor Operation
 Dive Planning and Management
 Equipment Care
 Mixed Gas Blender/Nitrox Gas Blender
 Search and Recovery
 Wreck Appreciation

Safety and Rescue:
 Advanced Lifesaver Award
 Automated External Defibrillator
 First Aid for Divers
 Lifesaver Award
 Oxygen Administration
 Practical Rescue Management

Seamanship:
 Boat Handling
 Chartwork and Position fixing
 Diver Coxswain Assessment
 Outboard engine and Boat Maintenance

Special Interest:
 Underwater Photography
 Ice Diving

 Mixed gas open circuit: 
 Sport Mixed Gas Diver
 Explorer Mixed Gas Diver
 Advanced Mixed Gas Diver

Rebreather/mixed gas rebreather:
 CCR Inspiration Evolution/Vision Diver
 Sport Mixed Gas CCR Diver
 Explorer Mixed Gas CCR Diver
 Advanced Mixed Gas CCR Diver

EUF Certification
BSAC obtained CEN certification from the EUF certification body in 2007 and re-certified in 2012 and 2019 for the following recreational diver grades:
 Discovery Diver – ISO 24801-1
 Ocean Diver – EN 14153-2/ISO 24801-2 – 'Autonomous Diver'
 Dive Leader – EN 14153-3/ISO 24801-3 – 'Dive Leader'
 Open Water Instructor – EN 14413-2/ISO 24802-2 – 'Instructor Level 2'
 Sports Diver – ISO 11107 – 'Nitrox diving'
 Nitrox Gas Blender – ISO 13293 – 'Level 1 Gas Blender'
 Mixed Gas Blender – ISO 13293 – 'Level 2 Gas Blender'
 Snorkelling Guide – ISO 13970 – 'Snorkelling Guide'

Snorkeller Training Programme
The BSAC has four snorkeller grades: 
 Dolphin Snorkeller: experience based training intended for children using only swimming pools.
 Snorkel Diver: training for pool or sheltered water activity.
 Advanced Snorkeller: training for open water activity.
 Snorkel Dive Manager: training to plan, organise and lead snorkelling activities.

The STP has three snorkel instructor grades: 
 Snorkel Instructor.
 Advanced Snorkel Instructor.
 Snorkel Instructor Trainer.  
BSAC scuba instructors can also teach all or parts of the STP subject to meeting pre-requisites including additional training.

See also

Organizations

People

Wrecks

References

External links

 British Sub-Aqua Club - BSAC website
 BSAC Japan
 BSAC Korea
 BSAC Thailand

Diver organizations
Organisations based in Cheshire
Sub-aqua
sub-aqua
sub-aqua
Underwater diving in the United Kingdom
Underwater diving training organizations